The Manor of Worksop is a feudal entity in the Dukeries area of Nottinghamshire, England. Held in Grand Serjeanty by a lord of the manor, it was originally connected with nearby Worksop Manor, a stately home.

History
Under the feudal system in late and high medieval England, tenure by serjeanty was a form of land-holding in return for some specified service, usually the discharge of duties in the household of the king or other high-ranking noble. Allegedly created to commemorate the Danegeld (c.1163), it is said that the Worksop serjeanty was already known in the time of King Alfred if not earlier. In 1327 tenure was passed to Worksop Manor from Farnham Royal, Buckinghamshire. In 1541 Worksop Manor was held by George Talbot, 6th Earl of Shrewsbury, before passing to the Dukes of Norfolk, in whose family it remained until 1840. The estate was then sold to the Dukes of Newcastle of nearby Clumber Park who owned it until the 20th century. The land and the lordship then passed to corporate owners. In 1994 the title was bought by John Hunt (died 2016), a retired transport manager of Worksop, for a reported £40,000.

Privileges
The lords of the manor of Worksop traditionally belong to the people involved in coronations of the British monarch. Holding the serjeanty requires the lord of the manor of Worksop to render to the Sovereign a pair of white gloves, and also to support their right arm while carrying the sceptre.

Lords of the manor since 1761
Lords of the manor at coronations since 1761

1761 (coronation of George III): The 2nd Marquess of Rockingham (acting as deputy to the 9th Duke of Norfolk)
1821 (coronation of George IV): The 12th Duke of Norfolk
1831 (coronation of William IV): The 12th Duke of Norfolk
1838 (coronation of Victoria): The 12th Duke of Norfolk
1902 (coronation of Edward VII): The 7th Duke of Newcastle
1911 (coronation of George V): The 7th Duke of Newcastle
1937 (coronation of George VI): The Earl of Lincoln (acting as deputy to his father, the 8th Duke of Newcastle)
1953 (coronation of Elizabeth II): None, as the manor was then under corporate ownership. The Chancellor of the Duchy of Lancaster (Lord Woolton) presented the Glove.

References

British monarchy
History of Nottinghamshire